Batrachedra illusor is a moth in the family Batrachedridae. It is found in North America, where it has been recorded from California, Illinois, Indiana and Ohio.

The wingspan is about 8 mm. Adults have been recorded on wing in March and from May to July.

References

Natural History Museum Lepidoptera generic names catalog

Batrachedridae
Moths of North America
Moths described in 1966